The 2022–23 McNeese Cowgirls basketball team represents McNeese State University during the 2022–23 NCAA Division I women's basketball season. The Cowgirls, led by second year head coach Lynn Kennedy, play their home games at The Legacy Center located on the McNeese State University campus in Lake Charles, Louisiana. They are members of the Southland Conference.

Previous season
The Cowgirls finished the 2021–22 season with a 13–15 record overall and an 8–6 record in conference play.  They qualified for the 2022 Southland Conference women's basketball tournament as the No. 4 seed.  Their season ended with a 63–90 loss to No. 5 seeded Incarnate Word.

Preseason polls

Southland Conference Poll
The Southland Conference released its preseason poll on October 25, 2022. Receiving 98 votes, the Cowgirls were picked to finish sixth in the conference.

Preseason All Conference
Kali Chamberlin was selected as a returning member of the Preseason All Conference first team.  Desirae Hansen was selected as a member of the second team for the third time.

Roster

Schedule

|-
!colspan=9 style=| Non-conference regular season

|-
!colspan=9 style=| Southland regular season

|-
!colspan=9 style=| 2023 Jersey Mike's Subs Southland Basketball Tournament
|-

See also
 2022–23 McNeese Cowboys basketball team

References

McNeese Cowgirls basketball seasons
McNeese
McNeese
McNeese